36 Andromedae is a visual binary star system in the northern constellation of Andromeda. The designation is from the star catalogue of English astronomer John Flamsteed, first published in 1712. It is faintly visible to the naked eye with an apparent visual magnitude of 5.45. An annual parallax shift of 26.33 mas yields a distance estimate of about 124 light years. The system is moving closer to the Sun with a radial velocity of −0.8 km/s.

The binary nature of this system was discovered in 1832 by the German-Russian astronomer Wilhelm von Struve. It is a wide binary with an orbital period of 167.5 years and an eccentricity of 0.3. As of 2016, the pair had an angular separation of 0.90 arc seconds along a position angle of 330°.

The primary, component A, is a magnitude 6.12 F-type star with a stellar classification of G8 IV, while the secondary, component B, has a magnitude of 6.54 and is a K-type star of class K3 IV. Their brightness compared to their temperatures indicate they are evolving subgiant stars. However, at least one of the components is subject to flare activity, which may suggest they are instead pre-main sequence stars.

References

External links
 Image 36 Andromedae

G-type subgiants
K-type subgiants
Binary stars
Andromeda (constellation)
Durchmusterung objects
Andromedae, 36
005286
004288
0258